Beyond the Blackboard is a Hallmark Hall of Fame made-for-television drama film starring Emily VanCamp and Treat Williams. It is based on the memoir by Stacey Bess titled Nobody Don't Love Nobody.

Plot
The story takes place in 1987 and follows a young teacher and mother of two who, fresh from college, ends up teaching homeless children at a school without a name.  With the support of her husband, she overcomes fears and prejudice to give these children the education they deserve.

Filming
This film was filmed in and around Albuquerque, New Mexico.

This was the first project together for Emily VanCamp and Treat Williams since Everwood.

Cast
 Emily VanCamp — Stacey Bess
 Paola Andino - Maria
 Timothy Busfield — School District HR Representative
 Steve Talley — Greg Bess
 Treat Williams — Dr. Warren
 Isabella Acres — Dana
 Melissa Schroeder - Terri
 Liam McKanna - Danny

Release
The film aired on April 24, 2011 on CBS; it was the last Hallmark Hall of Fame film broadcast on that network, which cancelled the series due to low ratings.

References

External links

Watch Beyond the Blackboard at SpiritClips.com.

2011 television films
2011 films
2011 biographical drama films
American biographical drama films
CBS network films
Biographical films about educators
Films about homelessness
Films based on biographies
Films set in 1987
Films shot in New Mexico
Hallmark Hall of Fame episodes
Films directed by Jeff Bleckner
American drama television films
2010s English-language films
2010s American films